Tillandsia tovarensis is a species of flowering plant in the genus Tillandsia. This species is native to Bolivia, Colombia, Peru, Venezuela and Ecuador.

References

tovarensis
Flora of South America
Epiphytes
Plants described in 1896